Koncert is a 1982 Polish documentary movie. Among others, the film features performances of such bands, as Perfect, Republika, TSA, Maanam, and Brygada Kryzys.

External links

Polish documentary films
Documentary films about Poland
Concert films
Culture in Łódź
1982 films
1982 documentary films
1981 in Poland
Polish music
Documentary films about music festivals